Sativus, a Latin word meaning cultivated, may refer to:

 Daucus carota subsp. sativus, the carrot, a plant species

See also
 List of Latin and Greek words commonly used in systematic names
 Sativa
 Sativum (disambiguation)